ICSI may refer to:

 Intracytoplasmic sperm injection, a medical technique used in assisted reproduction
 International Computer Science Institute, a non-profit research lab in Berkeley, California
 Institute of Company Secretaries of India, a professional organisation in India